Thomasson may refer to:

Thomasson (surname)
Hyperart Thomasson, a form of conceptual or found object art

See also
Thomas (disambiguation)
Thomaso
Thomason (disambiguation)
Thomassen
Thomaston (disambiguation)
Thomson (disambiguation)
Tomson
Tómasson